Clupeosoma cinerea is a moth in the family Crambidae. It was described by William Warren in 1892. It is found in Japan (Hokkaido, Honshu, Shikoku, Kyushu, Tsushima, Yakushima), Borneo, China, Russia and Taiwan.

The wingspan is 21–26 mm. The wings are fuscous cinereous (ash gray) with a slight purplish gloss. The transverse lines are dark brown.

References

Moths described in 1892
Odontiinae